is a railway freight terminal in Takaoka, Toyama, Japan, operated by Japan Freight Railway Company (JR Freight). The terminal is located at the end of the Shinminato Line.

History
Takaoka Freight Terminal opened on 27 January 1918.The station was absorbed into the JR Freight network upon the privatization of JNR on 1 April 1987.

Surrounding area
Man'yōsen Takaoka Kidō Line Shin-Yoshihisa Station

See also
List of railway stations in Japan

External links
Station and Container Guide (Japan  Freight Railway Company Kansai Branch) 

Railway stations in Toyama Prefecture
Stations of Japan Freight Railway Company
Railway freight terminals in Japan